The Mayo River is located in the Mexican state of Sonora.

The Adolfo Ruiz Cortines Dam generates electricity and irrigates agriculture in the Mayo Valley. It is 30 km east of the city of Navojoa, in the municipality of Álamos. Adolfo Ruiz Cortines was a president of Mexico.

See also
List of longest rivers of Mexico

References

Rivers of the Gulf of California
Rivers of Sonora
Rivers of the Sierra Madre Occidental